José López Lira (1892–1965) was a Mexican lawyer and politician. He served in the cabinet of Adolfo Ruiz Cortines as the Secretary of National Assets and Administrative Inspection.

References 

Mexican Secretaries of Energy
Institutional Revolutionary Party politicians
National Autonomous University of Mexico alumni
Academic staff of the National Autonomous University of Mexico
20th-century Mexican lawyers
Politicians from Guanajuato
1892 births
1965 deaths